Guan Daogao (1262 – 1319?) was a Chinese calligrapher, poet, and painter who lived during the Yuan Dynasty. She was born in Qixian, Wuxing (modern-day Huzhou, Zhejiang Province). She is known for the Avolokitesvara Saddarapundarika Sutra (Guanshiyin pumempin).

References

1262 births
1319 deaths
Year of death uncertain
Date of birth unknown
Date of death unknown
Chinese women poets
Chinese women painters
Women calligraphers
Yuan dynasty poets
Yuan dynasty painters
Yuan dynasty calligraphers
Poets from Zhejiang
Painters from Zhejiang
Writers from Huzhou